Ceutorhynchus omissus is a species of minute seed weevil in a family of beetles known as the Curculionidae. It is found in North America.

References

Further reading

 
 

Ceutorhynchini
Articles created by Qbugbot
Beetles described in 1917